The Rangoon Man is the 240th novel in the long-running Nick Carter-Killmaster series. It was written by Jack Canon.

Publishing history
The book was first published in September 1988.

Main characters
 Nick Carter, agent N-3, AXE
 Hawk, Carter's boss, head of AXE
 Sidney Chong, Importer and exporter of fine antiques
 Jane Camway, a leading British expert on Southeast Asian antiquities
 Rafael Oheda, Filipino financier
 Richard Garfield, AXE Station chief, Macau
 Charlie Verrain, AXE field agent
 Jillian Sorbonnia, AXE agent, Manila Section
 Leslie Munson, British MI6, Hong Kong
 Jane Soong, British MI6, Hong Kong

References

1988 novels
Nick Carter-Killmaster novels
Fiction set in 1988
Novels set in Myanmar